Vaiolini Ekuasi (born 11 October 2001) is a New Zealand rugby union player, who currently plays for the  in Super Rugby and  in New Zealand's domestic National Provincial Championship competition. His playing position is flanker.

Super Rugby statistics

References

External links
itsrugby.co.uk profile

2001 births
New Zealand rugby union players
Living people
Rugby union flankers
Auckland rugby union players
Blues (Super Rugby) players
Melbourne Rebels players
Expatriate rugby union players in Australia
New Zealand expatriate rugby union players